Mariano Herencia Zevallos (1820 in Supalla, Peru – February 2, 1873 in Chinchao District, Huánuco, Peru) was a Peruvian Army colonel and politician who briefly served as Interim President of Peru in 1872, following the murder of President José Balta.

After the fall of the Tomás Gutiérrez regime, Francisco Diez Canseco, President Balta's second Vice President, assumed power. The next day, control was transferred to Balta's first Vice President, Mariano Herencia Zevallos, in accordance with the 1860 constitution. Herencia completed the last week of Balta's term in office and handed power over to his elected successor, Manuel Pardo.

He served as the President of the Constituent Congress in 1867, and first vice president from 1868 to 1872.

Herencia was assassinated on February 2, 1873.

References

See also
List of presidents of Peru

1820 births
1873 deaths
Presidents of Peru
Vice presidents of Peru
Presidents of the Congress of the Republic of Peru
Assassinated Peruvian politicians
Deaths by firearm in Peru
People murdered in Peru